Svenska Cupen 1950 was the tenth season of the main Swedish football Cup. A significant achievement was made by third division Fagerviks GF who reached the semi-finals before their winning sequence came to an end. The competition was concluded on 23 July 1950 with the Final, held at Råsunda Stadium, Solna in Stockholms län. AIK won 3-2 against Helsingborgs IF before an attendance of 14,154 spectators.

Preliminary round

For other results see SFS-Bolletinen - Matcher i Svenska Cupen.

First round

For other results see SFS-Bolletinen - Matcher i Svenska Cupen.

Second round
The 8 matches in this round were played on 2 July 1950.

Quarter-finals
The 4 matches in this round were played on 9 July 1950.

Semi-finals
The semi-finals in this round were played on 16 July 1950.

Final
The final was played on 23 July 1950 at the Råsunda Stadium.

Footnotes

References 

1950
Cup
Sweden